Sabré Cook (born May 21, 1994 in Grand Junction, Colorado) is an American female racing driver and mechanical engineer. She has previously competed in the W Series.

Biography

Cook started her professional motorsport career with an invitation into the 2017 SCCA National Championship Runoffs event at Indianapolis Motor Speedway, finishing ninth in the Formula Enterprise class. She would step up to American entry level formula in 2018, running partial campaigns in both U.S.F2000 and Formula 4. Her best results would be a 14th in USF2000 (at Indianapolis) and a 15th in USF4 (at the Circuit of the Americas), however she would only be classified in the former championship standings as points are only awarded to the top 10 in F4.

She would qualify as one of the 18 permanent drivers for the 2019 W Series, a Formula 3 championship for women. Cook would have an anonymous debut with 13th at the Hockenheimring, but pushed Vivien Keszthelyi out of the race in Zolder which resulted in a drive-through penalty. A race-long battle with Sarah Moore saw her first points at Misano World Circuit Marco Simoncelli, and backed it up with a seventh-place finish in Nuremberg. Two more points in the final round at Brands Hatch saw her take 12th in the championship and the final automatic qualification place for the 2020 championship, but the season was cancelled with the onset of the COVID-19 pandemic. In response, she returned to US-based competition and the Indy Pro 2000 Championship, but ran out of funding after just two rounds.

Ahead of the 2023 season, Cook was named as the first member of the Porsche Deluxe Female Driver Development Program, granting her 2023 Porsche Carrera Cup North America entry fee aid as well as mentoring sessions with former Porsche factory driver Patrick Long.

Outside of driving, she also holds a Bachelors of Science in Mechanical Engineering form the Colorado School of Mines. She is the 2018 US Global final winner of the Infiniti Engineering Academy – an engineering program for international university students to compete and qualify for positions within Infiniti Global and Renault F1 Team.

Racing record

Career summary

* Season still in progress.

SCCA National Championship Runoffs

American open-wheel racing results

U.S. F2000 Championship

Indy Pro 2000 Championship

Complete W Series results
(key) (Races in bold indicate pole position) (Races in italics indicate fastest lap)

* Season still in progress.

References

External links

Profile at Driver Database
Website

1994 births
Living people
Racing drivers from Colorado
People from Grand Junction, Colorado
W Series drivers
SCCA National Championship Runoffs participants
U.S. F2000 National Championship drivers
Indy Pro 2000 Championship drivers
Karting World Championship drivers
United States F4 Championship drivers
HMD Motorsports drivers
American female racing drivers